Chaurchan is special festival of the Mithila region of Bihar and Nepal. It is a very important fasting for married women in Mithila. It is also known as Charchanna Pabni, Chauth Chand or Chauth Chandra or Chorchan Puja. It is dedicated to Lord Ganesha and Chandra Deva. It has a lot of religious significance.  On this day, married women keep a fast.  Different types of dishes are prepared as prasad.  Ganesh Chaturthi fast is also observed on this day.  Along with Lord Ganesha, Lord Vishnu, Goddess Parvati and the moon god is worshipped.  The story of Chorchan Puja is also heard on this day after that Arghya is offered to the moon god ( Chandra Deva ).

Description of Chaurchan Puja 

In the Chaurchan Puja, the fasting is observed for the whole day. Married women in Mithila clean the courtyard of their houses by smearing it with cow dung. After that some local religious pictures are drawn at the place where the puja will be performed with Pithar made of raw rice and some vermilion are placed on them. Various types of dishes, kheer, sweets, fruits, curd are served on large banana leaves in the courtyard. After that in the evening fasting women turn towards the west and offer Arghya to the lord moon. One by one, keeping the bowl of sweets, dishes, curd, banana, fruits etc, in their hand is offered to the moon by chanting mantras.

The following mantras are chanted while offering Arghya which are as follows

सिंहः प्रसेनमवधिस्सिंहो जाम्बवता हतः

सुकुमार मन्दिस्तव ह्येष स्यामन्तकः स्त'

Story of the Chaurchan Puja 

One day Lord Ganesha was roaming on Kailash with his vehicle mouse.  Then suddenly Chandra Deva started laughing seeing him, Lord Ganesha did not understand the reason for his laughter.  He asked Chandra Deva "Why are you laughing".  Responding to this, Chandra Deva said that he is laughing seeing the strange form of Lord Ganesha.  At the same time, he also revealed his form. Lord Ganesha got angry at Chandra Deva's tendency to make fun of him.  He cursed Chandra Deva that you are very proud of your appearance that you look very beautiful but from today you would become ugly.  Anyone who sees you will get a false stigma.  He will be called a criminal even though he has not committed any offence. On hearing the curse, Chandra Deva's pride was shattered.  He apologized to Lord Ganesha and said, "Lord, free me from this curse".  Seeing Chandra Deva repenting, Lord Ganesha forgave him.  The curse could not be withdrawn completely so it was said that anyone who would see the moon god on the day of Ganesh Chaturthi.  He will be falsely accused.  To avoid this, moon is worshiped in Mithila on the evening of Ganesh Chaturthi.

References 

Mithila
Hindu festivals
Festivals in India
Festivals in Nepal
Maithili language
Maithil Brahmin
Ancient culture